Fermín Solís Campos (born May 16, 1972) is a Spanish cartoonist, animator, and illustrator.  Born in Madroñera, Cáceres, Extremadura, his illustrations have appeared in Clio, Época and Rockdelux.   He is the author of numerous graphic novels and books; “his stories are about everyday life, relations, searching, coincidences, everything mixed with a small dosis of surrealism.”

Solís is self-taught, and his style was influenced by the work of Seth, Andi Watson, and Dupuy and Berberian.

He won the prize known as Certamen de Cómic e Ilustración at INJUVE in 2002 and the prize known as Autor Revelación in the Barcelona Comics Festival (Salón del Cómic de Barcelona) in 2004.

Books
Dando Tumbos (Subterfuge 2000)
Otra Vida (D2ble D2sis, 2001)
No te Quiero Pero te Amo un Poco (Aralia, 2002)
Los Días Más Largos (Balboa, 2003)
Un Pie Tras Otro (Plan B, 2003)
No te quiero, pero… (Astiberri, 2004)
Dan Laxante, Detective Cotidiano (Tebeo Vivo, 2004)
De Ballenas y Pulgas (Ariadna Editorial, 2004)
El Hombre del Perrito (Astiberri, 2005)
El Año que Vimos Nevar (Astiberri, 2005)
Las Pelusas de mi Ombligo # 1 (Cabezabajo, 2006)
Lunas de Papel (Dib-buks, 2007)
Las Pelusas de mi Ombligo #2 (Dolmen 2007)
Astro-Ratón y Bombillita # 1: Parece que Chispea (Mamut, 2008)
Buñuel en el Laberinto de las Tortugas (Editora Regional de Extremadura)

References

External links
 Official website
Fermín Solís on Lambiek

1972 births
Living people
People from Tierra de Trujillo
Spanish cartoonists
Spanish comics artists
Spanish illustrators
Spanish animators
20th-century Spanish artists